Donald Charles Campbell (November 25, 1916 – September 1, 1991) was an American football tackle who played with the Pittsburgh Pirates/Steelers of the National Football League for two seasons from 1939 to 1940. Campbell played college football at Carnegie Mellon University.

References

1916 births
1991 deaths
American football tackles
Carnegie Mellon Tartans football players
Pittsburgh Pirates (football) players
Pittsburgh Steelers players
Players of American football from New Jersey
People from South Amboy, New Jersey